Thysanus may refer to:
 Thysanus (insect), a genus of insects in the family Signiphoridae
 Thysanus, a genus of flowering plants in the family Connaraceae; synonym of Cnestis
 Thysanus, a genus of cnidarians in the family Faviidae; unknown status, described in 1863 by Duncan